The following lists events that happened during 1943 in the Belgian Congo.

Incumbents
Governor-general – Pierre Ryckmans

Events

See also

 Belgian Congo
 History of the Democratic Republic of the Congo

References

Sources

 
Belgian Congo
Belgian